General Inglis may refer to:

George Henry Inglis, (1902–1979), British Army major general
John C. Inglis (fl. 1970s–2020s), U.S. Air National Guard brigadier general
John Eardley Inglis (1814–1862), British Army major general
William Inglis (British Army officer) (1764–1835), British Army lieutenant general

See also
Harry C. Ingles (1888–1976), U.S. Army major general